Pata, officially the Municipality of Pata (Tausūg: Kawman sin Pata), is a 5th class municipality in the province of Sulu, Philippines. According to the 2015 census, it has a population of 22,163 people.

Geography

Barangays
Pata is politically subdivided into 14 barangays.
 Andalan
 Daungdong
 Kamawi
 Kanjarang
 Kayawan (Poblacion)
 Kiput
 Likud
 Luuk-tulay
 Niog-niog
 Patian
 Pisak-pisak
 Saimbangon
 Sangkap
 Timuddas

Climate

Demographics

Economy

References

External links
 Pata Profile at PhilAtlas.com
 [ Philippine Standard Geographic Code]
   Pata Profile at the DTI Cities and Municipalities Competitive Index
 Philippine Census Information
 Local Governance Performance Management System

Municipalities of Sulu
Island municipalities in the Philippines